Međurječje is a village in the southeast municipality of Čajniče, Republika Srpska, Bosnia and Herzegovina.

References

Populated places in Čajniče